Soash may refer to:

People
 Dick Soash (1941–2019), America farmer, rancher, and politician

Places
 Soash, Texas, ghost town, United States